Livio Nabab (born 14 June 1988) is a Guadeloupean professional footballer who plays as a striker for French Championnat National 2 side US Granville.

Club career
Nabab was born in Les Abymes, Guadeloupe. He made his professional debut for SM Caen on 4 April 2009 in a Ligue 1 game against Toulouse FC. He was loaned out to Stade Lavallois during the 2010–11 season. On 31 August 2013, he left Caen to play for Ligue 2 side Arles-Avignon.

Nabab played just one year of his three-year deal at Arles-Avignon, moving in July 2014 to Auxerre. At the end of the 2014–15 season he signed a two-year deal with Belgian club Waasland-Beveren.

In June 2016, Nabab returned to France, signing an initial one-year deal with US Orléans in Ligue 2. The option in the contract depending upon Orléans avoiding relegation was triggered and he remained with the club for a second season.

In July 2018, Nabab signed a two-year deal with Bourg-Péronnas in the Championnat National. Release by Bourg-Péronnas at the end of the 2019–20 season, he dropped down a division to Championnat National 2 with US Granville.

International career
Nabab has also represented Guadeloupe in international competition, playing for the team at the 2010 Caribbean Cup and the 2011 CONCACAF Gold Cup.

Career statistics

Club

International
Scores and results list Guadeloupe's goal tally first, score column indicates score after each Nabab goal.

References

1988 births
Living people
People from Les Abymes
Association football forwards
Guadeloupean footballers
Guadeloupe international footballers
French footballers
French people of Guadeloupean descent
Ligue 1 players
Ligue 2 players
Championnat National players
Championnat National 2 players
Championnat National 3 players
Belgian Pro League players
Stade Malherbe Caen players
Stade Lavallois players
AC Arlésien players
S.K. Beveren players
US Orléans players
Football Bourg-en-Bresse Péronnas 01 players
US Granville players
2011 CONCACAF Gold Cup players
French expatriate footballers
French expatriate sportspeople in Belgium
Expatriate footballers in Belgium